Tera Mera Saath Rahe or Tera Mera Saath Rahen means "Let Our Bond Remain Forever".

Tera Mera Saath Rahe may also refer to:

 Tera Mera Saath Rahen, a 2001 Indian drama film 
 Tera Mera Saath Rahe, a 2021 Indian television series